Joshpara is a kind of dumpling popular in Central Asia, South Caucasus and the Middle East. They are made of unleavened wheat dough squares filled with ground meat and condiments. In observance of the Islamic dietary rules, the meat filling is usually without pork.

Etymology 
Josh means "to boil" while para is a term for "bit" in early Persian. This word was commonly used prior to the 10th century, when it was replaced by the modern Persian name gosh e-barreh, meaning "lamb's ear". There are several variations of the name in other languages including Azerbaijani (düşbərə, dushbara), Kazakh (тұшпара, tushpara), Kyrgyz (чүчпара, chuchpara), Tajik (тушбера, tushbera), Uzbek (chuchvara) and Uyghur (چۆچۈرە, chöchürä). The Arabic word shishbarak or shushbarak is thought to be derived from joshpara in pre-Islamic times.

Another theory about the words' etymology is that the word comes from the Turkic word düşbərə.  The words tosh and dash mean "filled up" and "spill out", and berek means "food" (dishes made from dough). This alludes to the fact that düşbərə should be added in when the water is boiling and spilling out of the saucepan.

A common Azerbaijani joke suggests that the word comes from “düş bəri”, which means "fall here": in other words, asking to fill the spoon with as many dumplings as possible.

Regional variations

Turkic and Persian cuisines 
The dish is found in Azerbaijani, Iranian, Tajik, Uzbek, Uyghur, and other Central Asian cuisines.

The dough for Central Asian chuchvara or tushbera is made with flour, eggs, water, and salt. It is rolled into a thin layer, and cut into squares. A dollop of meat filling, seasoned with chopped onions, black pepper, salt and thyme, is placed at the center of each square, and the corners of the dumpling are pinched and folded. The dumplings are boiled in meat broth until they rise to the surface. Chuchvara can be served in a clear soup or on their own, with either vinegar or sauce based on finely chopped greens, tomatoes and hot peppers. Another popular way of serving chuchvara is to top the dumplings with syuzma (strained qatiq) or with smetana (sour cream). The latter is known as Russian-style.

In Azerbaijan, the dumplings are smaller and the dough is thicker.  are typically made from dough (wheat flour, egg, water), mutton (boneless), onions, vinegar, dried mint, pepper, and salt. The dish is prepared either with water or meat broth. Mutton can be substituted with beef, or even with chicken. The broth is made from mutton bones, and the ground meat is prepared with onions and spices. The dough is then rolled, cut into small squares, and stuffed with ground meat. The squares are wrapped like triangles and the edges are pasted together, making shell-shaped figures. The dumplings are added into the boiling salty water and cooked until the dumplings come to the surface.  are served with sprinkled dried mint. Vinegar mixed with shredded garlic is added or served separately to taste. 5-8 düşbərəs typically fit on a spoon; however, in rural areas of Absheron, they are made small enough that a spoon can hold as many as 20.

Arab cuisines 

Shishbarak is prepared in Iraq, Jordan, Lebanon, Palestine, Syria, Hejaz, and the northern area of Saudi Arabia. After being stuffed with ground beef and spices, thin dough parcels are cooked in yogurt and served hot in their sauce. A part of Arab cuisine for centuries, a recipe for shushbarak appears in the 15th century Arabic cookbook from Damascus, Kitab al-tibakha.

Related dishes 
 Finnic peoples in Western Siberia were exposed to the dish by Iranian merchants during the Middle Ages and named it pelnan, meaning "ear bread". It was adopted in Russia in the 17th century, where the dish is referred to as pelmeni.
 Manti is another type of dumpling popular in Central and Western Asia.

See also 
 List of dumplings
 List of stuffed dishes

References

External links 
 AZ Cookbook
 Chuchvara in Uzbek cuisine (with a photograph)

Arab cuisine
Azerbaijani cuisine
Caucasian cuisine
Central Asian cuisine
Dumplings
Iraqi cuisine
Jordanian cuisine
Kazakhstani cuisine
Kyrgyz cuisine
Lebanese cuisine
Middle Eastern cuisine
Palestinian cuisine
Stuffed dishes
Syrian cuisine
Tajik cuisine
Uyghur cuisine
Uzbek dishes